Oleg Mikhaylov may refer to:

 Oleg Mykhaylov (born 1968), Ukrainian sport shooter
 Oleg Mikhailov (politician) (born 1987), Russian politician

  (born 1930), Soviet footballer
  (1932–2013), Soviet and Russian writer
  (1936–1991), Soviet actor
  (born 1975), Russian and Ukrainian screenwriter